Hermann George Bernard of Saxe-Weimar-Eisenach (4 August 1825 at Altenstein Castle – 31 August 1901 in Berchtesgaden) was Prince of Saxe-Weimar-Eisenach and Duke of Saxony, and a general in the Württemberger army.

Life 
Hermann was the third son of Prince Bernard of Saxe-Weimar-Eisenach (1792-1862) from his marriage to Ida of Saxe-Meiningen (1794–1852), the daughter of George I, Duke of Saxe-Meiningen. He was a nephew of Queen Adelaide of Great Britain.

In 1840, Hermann enrolled at the military academy of Württemberg.  He became a Major General and from 1859, he was commander of the Württemberg Royal Cavalry Division.  He received several medals, including the Order of St. Alexander Nevsky, the Grand Cross of the Order of the White Falcon, the Order of Saint Stephen of Hungary and the Order of the Crown.

He died on 31 August 1901 and was buried at the Pragfriedhof in Stuttgart.

The  in Stuttgart is named after him.

Marriage and issue 
Hermann married on 17 June 1851 in Friedrichshafen to Princess Augusta of Württemberg (1826-1898), the youngest daughter of King William I of Württemberg.  They had the following children:
 Pauline (1852–1904)
 married 1873 to Hereditary Grand Duke Charles Augustus of Saxe-Weimar-Eisenach (1844-1894)
 Wilhelm (1853-1924)
 married in 1885 to Princess Gerta of Isenburg-Büdingen-Wächtersbach (1863-1945)
 Bernhard (1855-1907), from 1901 "Count of Crayenburg", married
 in 1900 Marie Louise Brockmüller (1866-1903)
 in 1905 Countess Elisabeth von der Schulenburg (1869-1940)
 Alexander (1857-1891)
 Ernest (1859-1909)
 Olga (1869-1924)
 married in 1902 Prince Leopold of Isenburg-Büdingen (1866-1933), eldest son of Karl, Prince of Isenburg-Büdingen.

Honours 
He received the following orders and decorations:

Ancestry

References 
 Staatshandbuch für das Großherzogtum Sachsen-Weimar-Eisenach, Weimar, 1864,  p. 6 (Online)

Footnotes 

Princes of Saxe-Weimar-Eisenach
Military personnel of Württemberg
House of Wettin
1825 births
1901 deaths
19th-century German people
Recipients of the Iron Cross, 2nd class
Grand Crosses of the Order of Saint Stephen of Hungary
Recipients of the Order of the Netherlands Lion
Grand Crosses of the Order of Saint-Charles